Amr ibn Abasa was one of the Sahaba and one of the narrators of hadith.

Biography
By his own account, 'Amr ibn 'Abasa met Muhammad in Mecca in the early days of his prophethood, and asked him, "What are you?" He replied, "I am a Prophet." 'Amr then asked, "What is a Prophet?" He replied, "I have been sent by God." "What has God sent you with?" 'Amr asked. "With the commandment to destroy idols and to treat one's relatives with kindness; to believe in one God and not to treat anyone as His partner," replied Muhammad.

He died in Homs and was buried there. He had a son named Abd-Allah.

See also
 Baba Amr

References

Sahabah hadith narrators